Miguel Ángel Gómez Martínez (born 1949 in Granada, Spain) is a Spanish conductor and composer. With Germanic education, he is known for his ability not to need a score when conducting and for his rigour when he interprets works always respecting the composers' intentions.

Biography

Academic education 
Born within a family of musicians, his father was a professor in the Band of Granada and his mother a pianist. Since childhood he was very clear that he wanted to become a conductor.

"I started to study music at the age of four, by my own will and against my parent's will."

At the age of five he was able to pass an examination at the Victoria Eugenia Music Conservatory of Granada and at the age of seven in 1957, he climbed to the podium and did not only steadily conduct the professors of the Band, but also corrected some errors made by the transcriber in the score.

At  age of thirteen he got the title of piano professor at the Music Conservatory of Granada and at age of seventeen he won the 'Extraordinary Prize' in composition at the Music Conservatory of Madrid. 1964 he moved to Madrid and he got the First Class Diploma and the Price of the Conservatory at the final course.

With the March scholarship, Gómez-Martínez continued his studies of orchestra and choral conducting in Vienna under Hans Swarowsky’s direction. He got his qualification at the age of 21, with the Prize of the Austrian Ministry of Education and Sciences.

Trajectory as a conductor 
His debut as conductor is dated at Sankt Pölten near Vienna, 1973 and then he conducted in Lucerne and Berlin, where he conducted “Fidelio” by Beethoven. In Spain he made his debut 1975 at the International Music and Dance Festival in Granada.

From this moment he began a career which led him to become Chief Conductor and Artistic Director of numerous international orchestras: permanent conductor at the Vienna State Opera (1976-1982), in which he was distinguished later by becoming permanent guest conductor, and Chief Conductor of the Spanish Radio Television Symphony Orchestra (RTVE) (1984-1987), where he was preceded by Enrique García Asensio and Odón Alonso. In 1987 he announced his intention to leave this orchestra as several improvements of the musician's conditions were not fulfilled, such as a higher remuneration and a better image. Chief Conductor or the Teatro de la Zarzuela (1985-1991), He became Chief Conductor of the Euskadi Orchestra (1989-1993), General Music Director of the City of Mannheim (1990-1993) Musical and Artistic Director of the New Finnish National Opera Helsinki (1993-1996), Chief Conductor of the Hamburg Symphony Orchestra (1992-2000), orchestra which has nominated him as Honorary Director, Chief Conductor of the Orquesta de Valencia (1997-2004), in which he continues being guest conductor, General Music Director of the Theatre of Bern (2000-2004), Director of the National Theatre in Mannheim (2004-2005) and since 2004 he is the Musical Director of the Easter Festival Orchestra in Bayreuth.

During his career he has conducted the most outstanding international orchestras in Europe, USA and in the Far East, as well as most of the Spanish Orchestras. Besides this, he has conducted numerous soloists and singers of recognised international prestige, such as Boris Chistoff, Birgit Nilson, Cesare Siepi, Alfredo Kraus, Luciano Pavarotti, Montserrat Caballé, Plácido Domingo, Ainhoa Arteta, Leo Nucci, as well as many well known instrumentalists such as Mstislav Rostropovitch, Pinchas Zuckermann, Alicia de Larrocha, Maxim Vengeroff, Anne Sophie Mutter amongst many others.

Trajectory as a composer 
Gómez Martínez has combined his career as a conductor with one as a composer. Due to his numerous commitments he has often been obliged to compose in the between concert engagements and on board aeroplanes.

Among his works stand out Suite Burlesca (1972), Sinfonía del Descubrimiento (Symphony of the Discovery) (1992) with occasion of the 500th. Anniversary of the Discovery of America, Five songs on Poems by Alonso Gamo (1996) for soprano and orchestra, Sinfonía del Agua (Water Symphony) (2007) by order made by EMASAGRA, Morning dawning (Passacaglia) (2010), work for piano, “Atallah”, his only opera until now, “Letters from a lover” work for baritone and symphony orchestra dedicated to his wife, Alessandra, Concerto for piano and orchestra, Concerto for violin and orchestra, as well as several works for piano solo, all of them composed between 2012 and 2013.

Concept of orchestral conducting 
As a conductor, Miguel Angel Gomez Martínez is well known for his ability to memorise scores and he conducts by heart with an affinity for the 'humanist method':

"A conductor should look at the faces of his musicians."

As a conductor his special interest is, above all, reproducing the composer’s intentions and he believes it essential that a conductor must do this as faithfully as possible without adding or eliminating anything from the original score.

"In the scores is written everything what we have to know, without adding or removing anything."

Prizes 
During his career he has received numerous prizes. He was awarded the Gold Medal of the City of Granada for his extraordinary artistic merits 1984, he is designated 'Citizen of Granada of the 20th Century' by the Town Hall of Granada, his home city, 1995 King Juan Carlos I has awarded him with the Encomienda de Número of the Order of Civil Merit. The Ministry of Culture of the State of Bavaria has awarded him with the special prize “ The Lion of Bavaria” for his work leading the Young Orchestra of the Easter Festival in Bayreuth. He is a member of the Royal Academy of Fine Arts of Granada and a Member of Honour in different musical associations in Spain and Europe, as well as being awarded gold or silver medals of various European cities.

References

External links
Orchestra Conducting. Defense of the Work. Has Swarowsky, translation into Spanish by Miguel Angel Gomez Martinez.- Universal Edition Vienna, 1979, Real Musical, Madrid 1989
Miguel Angel Gomez Martinez’s official web page
Biography (in Spanish)
Biography (in Spanish)
Interview with Miguel A. Gomez-Martinez, December 2, 1982

1949 births
Living people
Spanish composers
Spanish male composers
Spanish conductors (music)
Male conductors (music)
University of Music and Performing Arts Vienna alumni
21st-century conductors (music)
21st-century male musicians